Jiří Drvota (30 November 1922 – 30 November 2007) was a Czech basketball player. He competed in the men's tournament at the 1948 Summer Olympics.

References

External links
 

1922 births
2007 deaths
Czech men's basketball players
Olympic basketball players of Czechoslovakia
Basketball players at the 1948 Summer Olympics
Place of birth missing